Ethmia laphamorum is a moth in the family Depressariidae. The habitat consists of dry forests.

The ground color of the forewings is brownish with irregular darker markings. There is an elongated dark mark in the posterior area, as well as an irregular black band
from the base to the apex. The hindwings are whitish.

Etymology
The species is named in honor of Nick and Gardiner Lapham for their support of Área de Conservación Guanacaste rain forest land purchase for permanent wildland conservation.

References

Moths described in 2014
laphamorum